Chaperia is a genus of bryozoans belonging to the family Chaperiidae.

The genus has almost cosmopolitan distribution.

Species

Species:

Chaperia acanthina 
Chaperia albispina 
Chaperia australis

References

Bryozoan genera